

Ta 
Marwan Tabbara b. 1984 first elected in 2015 as Liberal member for Kitchener South—Hespeler, Ontario.
 Onésiphore Ernest Talbot b. 1854 first elected in 1896 as Liberal member for Bellechasse, Quebec.
 Peter Talbot b. 1854 first elected in 1904 as Liberal member for Strathcona, Northwest Territories.
 Geng Tan b. 1963 first elected in 2015 as Liberal member for Don Valley North, Ontario.
 Alain Tardif b. 1946   first elected in 1979 as Liberal member for Richmond, Quebec.
 Monique Tardif b. 1936   first elected in 1984 as Progressive Conservative member for Charlesbourg, Quebec.
 Paul Tardif b. 1910   first elected in 1959 as Liberal member for Russell, Ontario.
 Joseph Israël Tarte b. 1848 first elected in 1891 as Conservative member for Montmorency, Quebec.
 Henri Thomas Taschereau b. 1841 first elected in 1872 as Liberal member for Montmagny, Quebec.
 Thomas Linière Taschereau b. 1850 first elected in 1884 as Conservative member for Beauce, Quebec.
 Joseph Tassé b. 1848 first elected in 1878 as Conservative member for City of Ottawa, Ontario.
 Yvon-Roma Tassé b. 1910   first elected in 1958 as Progressive Conservative member for Quebec East, Quebec.
 Filomena Tassi b. 1962 first elected in 2015 as Liberal member for Hamilton West—Ancaster—Dundas, Ontario.
 Charles Keith Taylor b. 1931   first elected in 1972 as Progressive Conservative member for Churchill, Manitoba.
 Don L. Taylor b. 1931   first elected in 1979 as Progressive Conservative member for Cowichan—Malahat—The Islands, British Columbia.
 George Taylor b. 1840 first elected in 1882 as Conservative member for Leeds South, Ontario.
 Gordon Edward Taylor b. 1910   first elected in 1979 as Progressive Conservative member for Bow River, Alberta.
 James Davis Taylor b. 1863 first elected in 1908 as Conservative member for New Westminster, British Columbia.
 James Samuel Taylor b. 1872 first elected in 1935 as Cooperative Commonwealth Federation member for Nanaimo, British Columbia.
 John Russell Taylor b. 1917   first elected in 1957 as Progressive Conservative member for Vancouver—Burrard, British Columbia.
 Leonard William Taylor b. 1952   first elected in 1988 as New Democratic Party member for The Battlefords—Meadow Lake, Saskatchewan.
 William Horace Taylor b. 1889   first elected in 1926 as Liberal member for Norfolk—Elgin, Ontario.
Leah Taylor Roy first elected in 2021 as Liberal member for Aurora—Oak Ridges—Richmond Hill, Ontario.

Te 

 Roger-Joseph Teillet b. 1912   first elected in 1962 as Liberal member for St. Boniface, Manitoba.
 Andrew Telegdi b. 1946   first elected in 1993 as Liberal member for Waterloo, Ontario.
 William Pattison Telford, Sr. b. 1836 first elected in 1904 as Liberal member for Grey North, Ontario.
 William Pattison Telford, Jr. b. 1867 first elected in 1926 as Liberal member for Grey North, Ontario.
 Louis Tellier b. 1842 first elected in 1878 as Conservative member for St. Hyacinthe, Quebec.
 Lui Temelkovski b. 1954   first elected in 2004 as Liberal member for Oak Ridges—Markham, Ontario.
 Anthony Robert Temple b. 1926   first elected in 1963 as Liberal member for Hastings South, Ontario.
 Thomas Temple b. 1818 first elected in 1884 as Conservative member for York, New Brunswick.
 William Templeman b. 1842 first elected in 1906 as Liberal member for Victoria City, British Columbia.
 Anna Marina Terrana b. 1937   first elected in 1993 as Liberal member for Vancouver East, British Columbia.
 Claude Tessier b. 1943   first elected in 1974 as Liberal member for Compton, Quebec.
 Oza Tétrault b. 1908   first elected in 1968 as Ralliement Créditiste member for Villeneuve, Quebec.
 J.-Eugène Tétreault b. 1884   first elected in 1930 as Conservative member for Shefford, Quebec.
 Jacques Tétreault b. 1929   first elected in 1988 as Progressive Conservative member for Laval-des-Rapides, Quebec.

Th 

 Blaine Thacker b. 1941 first elected in 1979 as Progressive Conservative member for Lethbridge—Foothills, Alberta.
 Peter Thalheimer b. 1936 first elected in 1993 as Liberal member for Timmins—Chapleau, Ontario.
 Ross Thatcher b. 1917 first elected in 1945 as Cooperative Commonwealth Federation member for Moose Jaw, Saskatchewan.
 Joseph Thauvette b. 1876 first elected in 1930 as Liberal member for Vaudreuil—Soulanges, Quebec.
 Luc Thériault b. 1960 first elected in 2015 as Bloc Québécois member for Montcalm, Quebec.
 Olaüs Thérien b. 1860 first elected in 1887 as Conservative member for Montcalm, Quebec.
 Alain Therrien b. 1966 first elected in 2019 as Bloc Québécois member for La Prairie, Quebec.
 Ève-Mary Thaï Thi Lac b. 1972 first elected in 2007 as Bloc Québécois member for Saint-Hyacinthe—Bagot, Quebec. 
 Isidore Thibaudeau b. 1819 first elected in 1874 as Liberal member for Quebec East, Quebec.
 Léandre Thibault b. 1899 first elected in 1953 as Liberal member for Matapédia—Matane, Quebec.
 Louise Thibault b. 1947 first elected in 2004 as Bloc Québécois member for Rimouski—Témiscouata, Quebec.
 Robert Thibault b. 1959 first elected in 2000 as Liberal member for West Nova, Nova Scotia.
 Glenn Thibeault b. 1969 first elected in 2008 as New Democratic member for Sudbury, Ontario.
 Yolande Thibeault b. 1939 first elected in 1997 as Liberal member for Saint-Lambert, Quebec.
 William Thoburn b. 1847 first elected in 1908 as Conservative member for Lanark North, Ontario.
 Charles Humbert Thomas b. 1915 first elected in 1968 as Progressive Conservative member for Moncton, New Brunswick.
 J. Antonio Thomas b. 1912 first elected in 1965 as Liberal member for Maisonneuve—Rosemont, Quebec.
 Ray Thomas b. 1917 first elected in 1949 as Social Credit member for Wetaskiwin, Alberta.
 William Howell Arthur Thomas b. 1895 first elected in 1957 as Progressive Conservative member for Middlesex West, Ontario.
 Alfred Thompson b. 1869 first elected in 1904 as Conservative member for Yukon, Yukon.
 Alfred Burke Thompson b. 1862 first elected in 1925 as Conservative member for Simcoe East, Ontario.
 Andrew Thorburn Thompson b. 1870 first elected in 1900 as Liberal member for Haldimand and Monck, Ontario.
 Arthur Lisle Thompson b. 1884 first elected in 1939 as Liberal member for Kent, Ontario.
 Benjamin Cope Thompson b. 1924 first elected in 1957 as Progressive Conservative member for Northumberland, Ontario.
 David Thompson b. 1836 first elected in 1867 as Liberal member for Haldimand, Ontario.
 Greg Thompson b. 1947 first elected in 1988 as Progressive Conservative member for Carleton—Charlotte, New Brunswick.
 Joanne Thompson first elected in 2021 as Liberal member for St. John's East, Newfoundland and Labrador. 
 John Hall Thompson b. 1810 first elected in 1867 as Liberal member for Ontario North, Ontario.
 John Sparrow David Thompson b. 1844 first elected in 1885 as Liberal-Conservative member for Antigonish, Nova Scotia.
 Joshua Spencer Thompson b. 1828 first elected in 1871 as Liberal-Conservative member for Cariboo District, British Columbia.
 Myron Thompson b. 1936 first elected in 1993 as Reform member for Wild Rose, Alberta.
 Richard Frederick Thompson b. 1873 first elected in 1917 as Unionist member for Weyburn, Saskatchewan.
 Robert Norman Thompson b. 1914 first elected in 1962 as Social Credit member for Red Deer, Alberta.
 Sydney Herbert Thompson b. 1920 first elected in 1957 as Social Credit member for Edmonton—Strathcona, Alberta.
 Thomas Alfred Thompson b. 1868 first elected in 1930 as Conservative member for Lanark, Ontario.
 Thomas Henry Thompson b. 1866 first elected in 1917 as Unionist member for Hastings East, Ontario.
 John William Thomson b. 1928 first elected in 1979 as Progressive Conservative member for Calgary South, Alberta.
 Levi Thomson b. 1855 first elected in 1911 as Liberal member for Qu'Appelle, Saskatchewan.
 Roderick J. Thomson b. 1924 first elected in 1968 as New Democratic Party member for Battleford—Kindersley, Saskatchewan.
 Thomas Inkerman Thomson b. 1855 first elected in 1903 as Conservative member for Grey North, Ontario.
 Walter Thomson b. 1895 first elected in 1949 as Liberal member for Ontario, Ontario.
 William Alexander Thomson b. 1816 first elected in 1872 as Liberal member for Welland, Ontario.
 Scott Thorkelson b. 1958 first elected in 1988 as Progressive Conservative member for Edmonton—Strathcona, Alberta.
 Charles Jonas Thornton b. 1850 first elected in 1900 as Conservative member for Durham West, Ontario.
 Joseph Thorarinn Thorson b. 1889 first elected in 1926 as Liberal member for Winnipeg South Centre, Manitoba.
 Richard Devere Thrasher b. 1922 first elected in 1957 as Progressive Conservative member for Essex South, Ontario.
 John Jabez Thurston b. 1888 first elected in 1921 as Independent member for Victoria, Ontario.

Ti 

 Samuel Leonard Tilley b. 1818 first elected in 1867 as Liberal-Conservative member for City of St. John, New Brunswick.
 David Tilson b. 1941 first elected in 2004 as Conservative member for Dufferin—Caledon, Ontario.
 Harold Aberdeen Watson Timmins b. 1896 first elected in 1946 as Progressive Conservative member for Parkdale, Ontario.
 Tony Tirabassi b. 1957 first elected in 2000 as Liberal member for Niagara Centre, Ontario.
 David Tisdale b. 1835 first elected in 1887 as Conservative member for Norfolk South, Ontario.

To 

 Brian Vincent Tobin b. 1954 first elected in 1980 as Liberal member for Humber—Port au Port—St. Barbe, Newfoundland and Labrador.
 Edmund William Tobin b. 1865 first elected in 1900 as Liberal member for Richmond—Wolfe, Quebec.
 Stanley Gilbert Tobin b. 1871 first elected in 1925 as Liberal member for Wetaskiwin, Alberta.
 Stephen Tobin b. 1836 first elected in 1872 as Liberal member for Halifax, Nova Scotia.
 Corey Tochor first elected in 2019 as Conservative member for Saskatoon—University, Saskatchewan. 
 William Frederick Todd b. 1854 first elected in 1908 as Liberal member for Charlotte, New Brunswick.
 Lawrence Toet b. 1962 first elected in 2011 as Conservative member for Elmwood—Transcona, Manitoba. 
 Vic Toews b. 1952 first elected in 2000 as Canadian Alliance member for Provencher, Manitoba.
 Donald Tolmie b. 1923 first elected in 1965 as Liberal member for Welland, Ontario.
 Fraser Tolmie first elected in 2021 as Conservative member for Moose Jaw—Lake Centre—Lanigan, Saskatchewan. 
 John Tolmie b. 1845 first elected in 1896 as Liberal member for Bruce West, Ontario.
 Simon Fraser Tolmie b. 1867 first elected in 1917 as Unionist member for Victoria City, British Columbia.
 Edwin Tolton b. 1856 first elected in 1900 as Conservative member for Wellington North, Ontario.
 William Rae Tomlinson b. 1902 first elected in 1935 as Liberal member for Bruce, Ontario.
 Alan Tonks b. 1943 first elected in 2000 as Liberal member for York South—Weston, Ontario.
 Philip Toone b. 1965 first elected in 2011 as New Democratic Party member for Gaspésie—Îles-de-la-Madeleine, Quebec.
 Hunter Tootoo b. 1963 first elected in 2015 as Liberal member for Nunavut. 
 Paddy Torsney b. 1962 first elected in 1993 as Liberal member for Burlington, Ontario.
 Albert Frederick Totzke b. 1882 first elected in 1925 as Liberal member for Humboldt, Saskatchewan.
 Robert Toupin b. 1949 first elected in 1984 as Progressive Conservative member for Terrebonne, Quebec.
 Adolphe Guillet dit Tourangeau b. 1831 first elected in 1870 as Conservative member for Quebec East, Quebec.
 Henri Tousignant b. 1937 first elected in 1979 as Liberal member for Témiscamingue, Quebec.
 Gordon Towers b. 1919 first elected in 1972 as Progressive Conservative member for Red Deer, Alberta.
 Frederick William Townley-Smith b. 1887 first elected in 1945 as Cooperative Commonwealth Federation member for North Battleford, Saskatchewan.
 Charles James Townshend b. 1844 first elected in 1884 as Liberal-Conservative member for Cumberland, Nova Scotia.

Tr 

 Arthur Trahan b. 1877 first elected in 1917 as Laurier Liberal member for Nicolet, Quebec.
 Owen C. Trainor b. 1894 first elected in 1953 as Progressive Conservative member for Winnipeg South, Manitoba.
 Hadley Brown Tremain b. 1874 first elected in 1911 as Conservative member for Hants, Nova Scotia.
 Barclay Edmund Tremaine b. 1839 first elected in 1875 as Liberal member for Victoria, Nova Scotia.
 Benoît Tremblay b. 1948 first elected in 1988 as Progressive Conservative member for Rosemont, Quebec.
 Jacques Raymond Tremblay b. 1923 first elected in 1967 as Liberal member for Richelieu—Verchères, Quebec.
 Jean-Noël Tremblay b. 1926 first elected in 1958 as Progressive Conservative member for Roberval, Quebec.
 Jonathan Tremblay b. 1984 first elected in 2011 as New Democratic Party member for Montmorency—Charlevoix—Haute-Côte-Nord, Quebec.
 Léonard-David Sweezey Tremblay b. 1896 first elected in 1935 as Liberal member for Dorchester, Quebec.
 Marcel R. Tremblay b. 1943 first elected in 1984 as Progressive Conservative member for Québec-Est, Quebec.
 Maurice Tremblay b. 1944 first elected in 1984 as Progressive Conservative member for Lotbinière, Quebec.
 Pierre Alexis Tremblay b. 1827 first elected in 1867 as Liberal member for Chicoutimi—Saguenay, Quebec.
 René Tremblay b. 1922 first elected in 1963 as Liberal member for Matapédia—Matane, Quebec.
 Stéphan Tremblay b. 1973 first elected in 1996 as Bloc Québécois member for Lac-Saint-Jean, Quebec.
 Suzanne Tremblay b. 1937 first elected in 1993 as Bloc Québécois member for Rimouski—Témiscouata, Quebec.
 Jesse Pickard Tripp b. 1883 first elected in 1940 as Liberal member for Assiniboia, Saskatchewan.
 Bradley Trost b. 1974 first elected in 2004 as Conservative member for Saskatoon—Humboldt, Saskatchewan.
 Bernard Trottier b. 1965 first elected in 2011 as Conservative member for Etobicoke—Lakeshore, Ontario. 
 James Trow b. 1825 first elected in 1872 as Liberal member for Perth South, Ontario.
 Reuben Eldridge Truax b. 1847 first elected in 1891 as Liberal member for Bruce East, Ontario.
 Justin Trudeau, b. 1971 first elected in 2008 as Liberal member for Papineau, Quebec.
 Pierre Elliott Trudeau b. 1919 first elected in 1965 as Liberal member for Mount Royal, Quebec.
 Denis Trudel b. 1963 first elected in 2019 as Bloc Québécois member for Longueuil—Saint-Hubert, Quebec.
 Jacques L. Trudel b. 1919 first elected in 1968 as Liberal member for Bourassa, Quebec.
 Karine Trudel first elected in 2015 as New Democratic Party member for Jonquière, Quebec.
 Susan Truppe b. 1959 first elected in 2011 as Conservative member for London North Centre, Ontario.

Tu 

 James Roy Tucker b. 1909 first elected in 1958 as Liberal member for Trinity—Conception, Newfoundland and Labrador.
 Joseph John Tucker b. 1832 first elected in 1896 as Liberal member for City and County of St. John, New Brunswick.
 Walter Adam Tucker b. 1899 first elected in 1935 as Liberal member for Rosthern, Saskatchewan.
 James Brockett Tudhope b. 1858 first elected in 1917 as Unionist member for Simcoe East, Ontario.
 William Ernest Tummon b. 1879 first elected in 1925 as Conservative member for Hastings South, Ontario.
 Charles Tupper b. 1821 first elected in 1867 as Conservative member for Cumberland, Nova Scotia.
 Charles Hibbert Tupper b. 1855 first elected in 1882 as Conservative member for Pictou, Nova Scotia.
 William Tupper b. 1933 first elected in 1984 as Progressive Conservative member for Nepean—Carleton, Ontario.
 Georges Turcot b. 1851 first elected in 1887 as Liberal member for Mégantic, Quebec.
 Arthur Joseph Turcotte b. 1850 first elected in 1892 as Conservative member for Montmorency, Quebec.
 Gustave Adolphe Turcotte b. 1848 first elected in 1907 as Liberal member for Nicolet, Quebec.
 Joseph Pierre Turcotte b. 1857 first elected in 1908 as Liberal member for Quebec County, Quebec.
 James Gray Turgeon b. 1879 first elected in 1935 as Liberal member for Cariboo, British Columbia.
 Onésiphore Turgeon b. 1849 first elected in 1900 as Liberal member for Gloucester, New Brunswick.
 Nycole Turmel b. 1942 first elected in 2011 as New Democratic Party member for Hull—Aylmer, Quebec. 
 Franklin White Turnbull b. 1881 first elected in 1930 as Conservative member for Regina, Saskatchewan.
 Ryan Turnbull b. 1977 first elected in 2019 as Liberal member for Whitby, Ontario. 
 Charles Robert Turner b. 1916 first elected in 1968 as Liberal member for London East, Ontario.
 Garth Turner b. 1949 first elected in 1988 as Progressive Conservative member for Halton—Peel, Ontario.
 John Barry Turner b. 1946 first elected in 1984 as Progressive Conservative member for Ottawa—Carleton, Ontario.
 John Mouat Turner b. 1900 first elected in 1935 as Liberal member for Springfield, Manitoba.
 John Turner b. 1929 first elected in 1962 as Liberal member for St. Lawrence—St. George, Quebec.
 Daniel Turp b. 1955 first elected in 1997 as Bloc Québécois member for Beauharnois—Salaberry, Quebec.
 John Gillanders Turriff b. 1855 first elected in 1904 as Liberal member for Assiniboia East, Northwest Territories.
 George James Tustin b. 1889 first elected in 1935 as Conservative member for Prince Edward—Lennox, Ontario.

Tw 

 Merv Tweed b. 1955 first elected in 2004 as Conservative member for Brandon—Souris, Manitoba.
 Thomas Tweedie b. 1871 first elected in 1917 as Unionist member for Calgary West, Alberta.

Ty 

 Richard Tyrwhitt b. 1844 first elected in 1882 as Conservative member for Simcoe South, Ontario.

T